Shö is a Kuki-Chin language dialect cluster of Burma and Bangladesh. There are perhaps three distinct dialects, Asho (Khyang), Chinbon, and Shendu.

Mayin and Longpaw are not mutually intelligible, but have been subsumed under the ISO code for Chinbon because Mayin-Longpaw speakers generally understand Chinbon.  Minkya is similarly included because most Minkya speakers understand Mayin.

Geographical distribution
Chinbon (Uppu) is spoken in the following townships of Myanmar.
Chin State: Kanpetlet and Paletwa townships
Magway Region: Saw and Sidoktaya townships
Rakhine State: Minbya township

Asho is spoken in Ayeyarwady Region, Bago Region, and Magway Region, and Rakhine State, Myanmar.

VanBik (2009:38) lists the following Asho dialects.
Settu (spoken from Sittwe to Thandwe — mostly Sittwe to Ann)
Laitu (spoken in Sidoktaya Township)
Awttu (spoken in Mindon Township)
Kowntu (spoken in Ngaphe, Minhla, Minbu)
Kaitu (spoken in Pegu, Mandalay, Magway)
Lauku (spoken in Myepone, Kyauk Phyu, Ann)

Shendu is spoken in Mizoram, India.

Phonology
The Asho dialect (K’Chò) has 26 to 30 consonants and ten to eleven vowels depending on the dialect.

 Voiced plosives /b d ɡ z/ are only heard in the Plains dialect.
 In the Plains dialect, dental plosives /t̪ t̪ʰ/ are pronounced as alveolar [t tʰ], along with /d/ being only alveolar.
 Velar plosives /k kʰ/ may be palatalized as affricates [tʃ tʃʰ] before front vowels.
 In some dialects a voiceless  is heard in place of /ʃ/.
 /j/ may also be heard as a fricative  in free variation among dialects.

Diphthongs: 

 Sounds /ʏ ʉ/ only occur in the Hill dialect. In the Plains dialect, /ʊ u/ is heard in place of /ʏ ʉ/.
 An shortened [ə̆] is heard in unstressed syllables.
 /ɤ/ can sometimes be heard as more central .
 A prevelarized /ˠi/ occurs in the Plains dialect.

Morphology
Similar to other Kukish languages, many Asho verbs have two distinct stems. This stem alternation is a Proto-Kukish feature, which has been retained to different degrees in different Kukish languages.

References

Kuki-Chin languages
Languages of Bangladesh